This list consists of institutions of higher education in the Indian state of Assam. These university/institutions under the state government usually follow a state-centric syllabus, universities under the central government follows the standard syllabus whereas the private university or educational institutes have their own syllabus.

Central University

Institute of National Importance

Deemed Universities

State Universities

Private Universities

Medical Colleges

Law Colleges

List of law colleges affiliated to Dibrugarh University, Dibrugarh
 Centre for Juridical Studies, Dibrugarh University
D.H.S.K. Law College, Dibrugarh
 Dr. Rohini Kanta Barua Law College, Dibrugarh
 Golaghat Law College, Golaghat
Jorhat Law College, Jorhat
 NERIM Law College, Guwahati
 North Lakhimpur Law College, North Lakhimpur
 Tinsukia Law College, Tinsukia
S.I.P.E. Law College,  Dibrugarh
 Lakhimpur lAW College, Lakhimpur
 Dhemaji Law College, Dhemaji

List of law colleges affiliated to Gauhati University, Guwahati
Bongaigaon Law College, Bongaigaon
BRM Government Law College, Guwahati
Dhubri Law College, Dhubri
Dispur Law College, Dispur
 Goalpara Law College, Goalpara
 JB Law College, Guwahati
 Kokrajhar Law College, Kokrajhar
Morigaon Law College, Morigaon
 Nalbari Law College, Nalbari
NEF Law College, Guwahati
Nowgong Law College, Nagaon
Tezpur Law College, Tezpur
 University Law College, Gauhati University

List of law colleges affiliated to Assam University, Silchar
 A. K. Chanda Law College
 Diphu Law College
 Karimganj Law College

Dental Colleges
Regional Dental College, Guwahati
Dibrugarh Dental College, Dibrugarh
Government Dental College, Silchar

Research Institutes

 Central Inland Fisheries Research Centre (ICAR), Regional Centre, Guwahati - 781006

Centre of Plasma Physics - Institute for Plasma Research (CPP-IPR),प्लाज्मा भौतिकी केंद्र - प्लाज्मा अनुसन्धान संसथान, Guwahati
Indian Statistical Institute, Tezpur
 Institute of Advanced Study in Science and Technology, Guwahati
National Institute of Pharmaceutical Education and Research, Guwahati
North East Institute of Science and Technology, Jorhat of Council of Scientific and Industrial Research
Anundoram Borooah Institute of Language, Art & Culture(ABILAC), Assam, Guwahati
Omeo Kumar Das Institute of Social Change and Development
Rain Forest Research Institute, Jorhat
Regional Medical Research Centre,Dibrugarh of Indian Council of Medical Research
Tocklai Tea Research Institute, Jorhat
Defence Research Laboratory, Tezpur

Engineering Colleges and Technical Institutes

Colleges under Assam Science and Technology University 
 Assam Engineering College, Jalukbari, Guwahati (State)
 Bineswar Brahma Engineering College, Kokrajhar (State)
 Girijananda Chowdhury Institute of Management and Technology, Tezpur (GIMT-Tezpur) (Public-Private)
 Girijananda Chowdhury Institute of Management and Technology (GIMT), Azara, Guwahati (Private)
 Dhemaji Engineering College, Dhemaji (State)
 Golaghat Engineering College, Golaghat (State)
 Barak Valley Engineering College, Karimganj (State)
 Jorhat Engineering College, Jorhat (State)
 Jorhat Institute of Science & Technology, Jorhat (State)
 Lokopriya Gopinath Bordoloi Regional Institute of Mental Health (LGBRIMH), Tezpur
 NETES Institute of Technology and Science Mirza (Private)
 Royal School of Engineering & Technology (Private)

Colleges under Assam Agricultural University
 Biswanath College of Agriculture, Biswanath Chariali
 College of Agriculture, Jorhat
 College of Fisheries (AAU), Raha, Nagaon
 College of Home Science, Jorhat
 College of Veterinary Science (C.V.Sc.), Khanapara
 Lakhimpur College of Veterinary Science (L.C.V.Sc.), North Lakhimpur

Colleges under Dibrugarh University
 Dibrugarh University Institute of Engineering and Technology   (DUIET), DU campus, Dibrugarh (State)

Colleges under Gauhati University
 Gauhati University Institute of Science and Technology (GUIST), GU Campus, Guwahati 
 Jettwings Business School, Guwahati

Colleges under Ministry of Chemicals and Fertilizers

 Central Institute of Petrochemical  Engineering and Technology (CIPET), Changsari, near Guwahati

Architecture institutes
 Guwahati College of Architecture, Guwahati
 Royal School of Architecture, Betkuchi, Guwahati
 Jettwings Institute Of Fashion, Design & Architecture -(JFDA), Uzanbazar, Guwahati

Autonomous Institutions
Indian Institute of Technology Guwahati
Indian Institute of Information Technology, Guwahati
National Institute of Technology, Silchar
Central Institute of Technology, Kokrajhar
Lokopriya Gopinath Bordoloi Regional Institute of Mental Health (LGBRIMH), Tezpur
National Law University and Judicial Academy, Assam
National Institute of Pharmaceutical Education and Research, Guwahati
National Institute of Design, Jorhat
Tata Institute of Social Sciences, Guwahati            
Arya Vidyapeeth College (Autonomous)   Guwahati
Jagannath Barooah College (Autonomous), Jorhat
Nowgong College (Autonomous), Nagaon

Hotel management institutes
 Jettwings Institute Of Aviation & Hospitality Management, GS Road, Guwahati
 Jettwings Hotel & Travel School Under TISS - SVE Deemed University - Approved by AICTE & MHRD New Delhi. 
 Assam Institute of Hotel Management, Guwahati
  IAM Institute of Hotel Management ,Guwahati
 Institute of Hotel Management, Guwahati
 North East Institute of Management Science, Jorhat

Management institutes
 Beinstein College, Lokhora, Guwahati 
Centre for Management Studies, Dibrugarh University 
 Department of Management Studies, National Institute of Technology, Silchar
 Assam Rajiv Gandhi University of Cooperative Management, Sivasagar
 Assam Institute of Management, Guwahati
 Asian Institute of Management and Technology
 Centre of Management Studies, Gauhati Commerce College, Guwahati
 CKB Commerce College, Jorhat
 Department of Business Administration, Gauhati University
 Don Bosco Institute of Management, Guwahati
 Girijananda Chowdhury Institute of Management and Technology, Guwahati
 Indian Institute for Finance And Management (IIFM),Guwahati
 Institute of Strategic Business Management (ISBM), Guwahati
 Jawaharlal Nehru School of Management Studies, Assam University
 Kaziranga University, School of Business, Jorhat
 NEF College of Management & Technology, Guwahati
 North Eastern Regional Institute of Management (NERIM), Guwahati
 Royal School Of Business, Guwahati
 School of Management Science, Tezpur University
 Times Institute of Management and Technical Studies (TIMTS, Guwahati
 Jettwings Business School (JBS), Uzanbazar, Guwahati

Arts, Science & Commerce colleges
 Abhayapuri College, Bongaigaon
 Amguri College, Amguri, Sivasagar 
 Anandaram Dhekial Phookan College, Nagaon
 Arya Vidyapeeth College (Autonomous), Guwahati
 Beinstein College of Science, Jalukbari, Guwahati
 B. Borooah College, Guwahati
 B. H. B. College, Barpeta
 Bahona College, Jorhat
 Bajali College, Barpeta
 Bapujee College, Sarukshetri
 Barpeta Girls' College, Barpeta
 Bengtol College,Chirang
 B. N. College, Dhubri
 Bihpuria College, Bihpuria, Lakhimpur
 Bilasipara College, Bilasipara
 Birjhora Mahavidyalaya, Bongaigaon
 Bongaigaon College, Bongaigaon
 Borholla College, Borholla, Jorhat
 Birjhora Kanya Mahavidyalaya, Bongaigaon
 Cachar College, Silchar
 CKB College, Teok, Jorhat
 CKB Commerce College, Jorhat
 Cotton College Guwahati
 Chaygaon College, Kamrup
 D. H. S. K. Commerce College, Dibrugarh
 Dakha Devi Rasiwasia College, Chabua
 Dakshin Kamrup College, Kamrup
 Dakshin Kamrup Girls' College, Kamrup
 Darrang College, Tezpur
 DCB Girls' College, Jorhat
 Debraj Roy College, Golaghat
 Dergaon Kamal Dowerah College, Dergaon
 Dhemaji College, Dhemaji
 Dhemaji Commerce College, Dhemaji
 Dhakuakhana College, Dhakuakhana
 Dhemaji Girls College, Dhemaji
 Dibrugarh City College, Dibrugarh
 Dibrugarh Hanumanbax Surajmall Kanoi College, Dibrugarh
 Dibru College, Dibrugarh 
 Digboi College, Digboi
 Dimoria College, Khetri Kamrup Metropolitan district
 Diphu Government College, Diphu
 Dispur College, Guwahati
 DoomDooma College, Doomdooma
 Dr. Nobin Bordoloi College, Dhekiajuli, Jorhat
 Dudhnoi College, Goalpara
 Duliajan College, Duliajan
 Duliajan Girls' College, Duliajan
 Gargaon College, Simaluguri, Sivasagar
 Gauhati Commerce College, Guwahati
 Goalpara College, Goalpara
 Gogamukh College, Gogamukh, Dhemaji
 Golaghat Commerce College, Golaghat
 Goreswar College, Goreswar
 Government Model College Deithor
 Guwahati College, Guwahati
 Haflong Government College, Haflong
 Handique Girls College, Guwahati
 Hatsingimari College, Hatsingimari
 Hemo Prova Borbora Girls' College, Golaghat
 Icon Commerce College, Guwahati
 J.D.S.G. College, Bokakhat
 Jagannath Barooah College, Jorhat
 Jagiroad College, Jagiroad
 Jhanji Hemnath Sarma College, Jhanji
 Jorhat College, Jorhat
 Jorhat Kendriya Mahavidyalaya, Jorhat
 Karmashree Hiteswar Saikia College, Guwahati
 K.C. Das Commerce College, Guwahati
 K.K. Handique Govt. Sanskrit College, Guwahati
 K. R. B. Girl's College, Guwahati
 Kakojan College, Jorhat
 Kamargaon College, Bokakhat
 Kampur College, Kampur
 Karimganj College, Karimganj
 Kokrajhar Government College, Kokrajhar
 Lakhimpur Commerce College, North Lakhimpur
 Lakhimpur Girls' College, North Lakhimpur
 Lakhimpur Kendriya Mahavidyalaya, North Lakhimpur
 Lakhipur College, Lakhipur
 Lalit Chandra Bharali College, Guwahati
 Lokanayak Omeo Kumar Das College, Dhekiajuli
 Lumding College, Lumding
 Madhab Chandra Das College, Sonai, Cachar
 Madhab Choudhury College, Barpeta
 Mahendra Narayan Choudhury Balika Mahavidyalaya, Nalbari
 Majuli College, Kamalabari, Majuli
 Mankachar College, Mankachar
 Manohari Devi Kanoi Girls College, Dibrugarh
 Mariani College, Mariani, Jorhat
 Melamora College, Melamora, Golaghat
 Margherita College, Margherita
 Moran College, Moranhat
 Moridhal College, Dhemaji
 Murkongselek College, Jonai
 Nabin Chandra College, Badarpur
 Nagaon GNDG Commerce College, Nagaon
 Nalbari College, Nalbari
 Namrup College, Namrup
 Nanda Nath Saikia College, Titabar, Jorhat
 Narangi Anchalik Mahavidyalaya, Guwahati
 Nilambazar College, Karimganj
 North Bank College, Ghilamara
 North Gauhati College, Guwahati
 North Lakhimpur College
 Nowgong College, Nagaon
 Nowgong Girls' College, Nagaon
 Pandu College, Guwahati
 Pithubar Girls' Degree College, Khowang
 Pragjyotish College, Guwahati
 Pramathesh Barua College, Gauripur
 Pub Kamrup College, Baihata Chariali, Pin 781381, Assam
 Rabindra Sadan Girls' College, Karimganj
 Radha Govinda Baruah College, Guwahati
 Ram Krishna Nagar College, Karimganj
 Rangapara College, Rangapara
 Rangia College, Rangia
 Sadiya College, Sadiya
 Sankaradeva Mahavidyalaya, Lakhimpur
 Sarupathar College, Sarupathar
 Science College, Kokrajhar
 Sibsagar College, Joysagar,  Sivasagar
 Sibsagar Commerce College, Sivasagar
 Sibsagar Girls' College, Sivasagar
 Silapathar College, Silapathar
 Silapathar Commerce College, Silapathar
 Silapathar Town College, Silapathar
 Sissi Borgaon College, Dhemaji
 Sonari College, Sonari
 Sonapur  College, Sonapur
 South Salmara College, South Salmara
 Suren Das College, Hajo
 Srikishan Sarda College, Hailakandi
 Swadeshi College of Commerce, Guwahati
 Tangla College, Tangla
 Tezpur College Tezpur
 Tihu College, Tihu
 Tinsukia College, Tinsukia
 Tinsukia Commerce College, Tinsukia
 Tyagbir Hem Baruah College (T.H.B), Jamugurihat, Sonitpur
 West Goalpara College, Goalpara
 Women's College, Tinsukia

References

Assam
Education
Universities and colleges in Assam